was a company that manufactured motorcycles from 1948 to 1967. The company's Lilac model motorcycle was recognized by the Society of Automotive Engineers of Japan , who included the 1950 Marusho Lilac ML as one of their 240 Landmarks of Japanese Automotive Technology.

History
Masashi Itō started Marusho in Hamamatsu, Japan, in 1948 after being apprenticed with Soichiro Honda. The company produced shaft driven models like the Lilac, and showcased its technical prowess to the world in the Mount Asama Volcano Race, competing well against the likes of Honda, Meguro, Yamaha, and Suzuki. Company founder Masashi Itō died in 2005 at the age of 92.

Lilac motorcycles
Dragon (350cc)
Lancer (350cc)
AQ (125cc)
UY (250cc)
BR (175cc)
PV (125cc)
LS (250cc)
ML 1950 150cc 2.43 kW/4000rpm
LB 1952 150cc
KD 1952 150cc
LS38 Lilac.Lancer.MkV 1959 250cc 14.92 kW/8000rpm
DP90 New.Baby.Lilac 1958 90cc 2.94 kW/5000rpm
LS18 MkII 1960 250cc 13.1 kW/6800rpm
C130 1964 125cc 10.9 kW/11000rpm
JF Baby.Lilac 1953 90cc 2.4 kW/5500rpm
Lilac.R92 Marusho.ST 1964 500cc 26.2 kW/6300rpm
Lilac.R92 Marusho.Magnum.Electra 1966 500cc 27.9 kW/7000rpm
Lilac.CF40 1960 125cc 7.72 kW/8000rpm
Lilac.Lance.SW 1955 400cc 8.82 kW/4800rpm
Lilac.Lance.SY 1955 250cc 6.25 kW/4700rpm

References

Motorcycle manufacturers of Japan
Defunct companies of Japan
Vehicle manufacturing companies established in 1948
Vehicle manufacturing companies disestablished in 1967
Japanese companies established in 1948
1967 disestablishments in Japan
Honda